Nucleoporin 155 (Nup155) is a protein that in humans is encoded by the NUP155 gene.

Nucleoporins are the main components of the nuclear pore complex (NPC) of eukaryotic cells. They are involved in the bidirectional trafficking of molecules, especially mRNAs and proteins, between the nucleus and the cytoplasm. The protein encoded by this gene does not contain the typical FG repeat sequences found in most vertebrate nucleoporins. Two protein isoforms are encoded by transcript variants of this gene.

Interactions
NUP155 has been shown to interact with GLE1L.

References

Further reading

Nuclear pore complex